Whitesville is an unincorporated community in Sussex County, Delaware, United States. Whitesville is located just north of the stateline with Maryland. between Delmar and Selbyville. Local folklore ascribes the name to Ezekiel Williams, who built the first house in the village.
 It is the site of the Line United Methodist Church.

See also
Transpeninsular Line

References

Unincorporated communities in Sussex County, Delaware
Unincorporated communities in Delaware